Yevgeniya Leonidova Isakova (born 27 November 1978) is a Russian former hurdler who specialised in the 400 metres hurdles.

She won the gold medal in the 400 m hurdles final at the 2006 European Athletics Championships in Gothenburg.

International competitions

National titles
Russian Athletics Championships
400 m hurdles: 2006

See also
List of people from Saint Petersburg
List of European Athletics Championships medalists (women)

References

1978 births
Living people
Athletes from Saint Petersburg
Russian female hurdlers
World Athletics Championships athletes for Russia
European Athletics Championships winners
European Athletics Championships medalists